Cephalotes pusillus is a species of arboreal ant in the genus Cephalotes, described in 1824 and characterized by its oddly shaped head and ability to glide if it falls from a tree, as gliding ants do.

References

pusillus
Insects described in 1824